Pseudonocardia antarctica is a bacterium from the genus of Pseudonocardia which has been isolated from soil from the McMurdo Dry Valleys from the Antarctica.

References

Pseudonocardia
Bacteria described in 2004